Men's Super G World Cup 2004/2005

Calendar

Final point standings

In Men's Super G World Cup 2004/05 all results count.

Note:

In the last race only the best racers were allowed to compete and only the best 15 finishers were awarded with points.

Men's Super G Team Results

bold = highest score italics = race wins

Note:

The last race saw two winners, both from the United States.

References
 fis-ski.com

World Cup
FIS Alpine Ski World Cup men's Super-G discipline titles